The Smith & Wesson 340PD is an ultra-light J-frame five shot snubnosed revolver chambered for .357 Magnum.

Design
It has a frame constructed of scandium enhanced aluminum alloy, a titanium alloy cylinder, and a corrosion resistant steel barrel liner. Unloaded it weighs only   and when loaded remains under .

With no external hammer it operates double action only.

M&P340 
A variant of the Model 340 is the M&P340, part of Smith & Wesson's M&P line of handguns. It features a PVD coating and stainless steel cylinder.  It has XS Sights® 24/7 Tritium Night sights and weighs 13.3 ounces (377.8 g).  It is available with or without an internal lock.

Design limitations
There is a prohibition against using ammunition with bullet weight less than  due to the risk of frame erosion from powder that is still burning after too rapid exit of the light projectile.  Another warning in the owners manual is recoil may pull the cases of unfired rounds in the cylinder rearward with enough force to unseat the bullets, causing the cylinder to jam. It has also been said that accuracy is compromised in these types of ultra-light revolvers since the barrel is a steel sleeve liner rather than a single solid piece of steel.

References

Smith & Wesson revolvers
Revolvers of the United States
.357 Magnum firearms
.38 Special firearms